Robert E. Wittes was Physician-in-Chief of Memorial Sloan-Kettering Cancer Center, from 2002 until December 31, 2012. Prior to his appointment at MSKCC, he was Deputy Director for Extramural Sciences and Director of the Division of Cancer Treatment and Diagnosis at the National Cancer Institute, where he oversaw NCI's extramural clinical and basic research programs, including the evaluation of new therapeutics, diagnostics, and translational research.
Wittes is a fellow of the American College of Physicians, a member of the American Association for Cancer Research, the American Society of Clinical Oncology, and the American Federation for Medical Research.
In addition to his institutional affiliations, Dr. Wittes has served as editor-in-chief of the Journal of the National Cancer Institute and Oncology. He has served on the editorial boards of Clinical Cancer Research, Current Opinion in Oncology, The American Journal of Clinical Oncology; Cancer Investigation, and The International Journal of Radiation Oncology-Biology & Physics, among others.

Biography

Wittes graduated from Harvard College in 1964 with a degree in chemistry and physics and then graduated cum laude from Harvard Medical School in 1968.  He completed an internship and residency in medicine at Beth Israel Hospital in Boston. He began his tenure with MSKCC in 1972 as a medical oncology fellow, rising over the next decade to Assistant Chief of its Solid Tumor Service.
In 1983, Wittes joined the National Cancer Institute as head of the Cancer Therapy Evaluation Program. He became Director of the Division of Cancer Treatment and Diagnosis in 1995, to lead the NCI's programs in drug discovery and development, clinical trials, diagnostic imaging, radiotherapy, and molecular diagnosis. When he assumed the additional role of Deputy Director for Extramural Science in 1997, he became responsible for the oversight, integration, coordination and enhanced communication across all extramural programs of the National Cancer Institute.
While at the NCI, Dr. Wittes was instrumental in establishing CancerNet, and the cancer clinical trials website, which offer the general public and health care professionals information about cancer, treatment and clinical trials. He also established NCI's Office of Cancer Complementary and Alternative Medicine in 1998.

As Physician-in-Chief at MSKCC beginning in 2002, Wittes presided over a period of extraordinary growth in both its clinical and research programs.   Because of his long clinical experience with MSKCC and a deep knowledge of new cancer therapeutics, gained while overseeing key elements of the nation's cancer research effort, he had the vision, skill and expertise to help guide the Center through this remarkable period.
His accomplishments as Physician-in-Chief at MSKCC include the establishment of the Human Oncology and Pathogenesis Program, the Survivorship Initiative, and the Quality of Care Initiative.  He also oversaw the construction of major new clinical facilities that have enhanced the center's programs in Surgery, Pathology, Pediatrics, Imaging, and the treatment of a full range of cancers.

Honors and awards

Vincent Astor Chair of Clinical Research – July 17, 2003 to 2012
The Geoffrey Beene Cancer Research Center 2010 Progress Report, Page 3
Memorial Sloan-Kettering Cancer Center

NIH Director’s Award – July 11, 2001 The National Institutes of Health Annual Director's Awards Ceremony 2001, Page 8

Public Health Service Distinguished Service Medal – June 22, 2000.

Personal life
Wittes is married to statistician Janet Wittes.

References 

Memorial Sloan-Kettering Cancer Center website: Memorial Sloan-Kettering Cancer Center website (February 2002)
“Robert E. Wittes Rejoins Memorial Sloan-Kettering as Physician-in-Chief”<<<
Charity Wire: “New Leadership at Memorial Sloan-Kettering” (December 26, 2001)
National Cancer Institute: Dr. Robert E. Wittes bio
The Center for Mind Body Medicine 1998 Keynote Speaker Biographies

External links 
Cancer: Getting Past the Fear, Parts I and II live video webcast via Medscape, Inc. and Healthology, LLC (November 18, 1999)
cis Dichlorodiammineplatinum (II) in the treatment of epidermoid carcinoma of the head and neck Cancer Treatment Reports, Volume 61, Issue 3, 1977, Pages 359-366
A kinetic approach to the determination of the S phase pool size of thymidine triphosphate in exponentially growing mouse L cells Journal of Molecular Biology, Volume 78, Issue 3, 15 August 1973, Pages 473–486
The current causes of death in patients with malignant melanoma European Journal of Cancer (1965), Volume 14, Issue 4, April 1978, Pages 327–330

Year of birth missing (living people)
Living people
American oncologists
Harvard Medical School alumni
Harvard College alumni
Memorial Sloan Kettering Cancer Center physicians